The Men's downhill competition of the 1984 Winter Olympics was held at Bjelašnica, Yugoslavia. Due to weather delays, it was run on Thursday, February 16, a full week after originally scheduled.

The reigning world champion was Harti Weirather of Austria, while teammate Franz Klammer was the reigning World Cup downhill champion and Switzerland's Urs Räber led the current season.
Similar to 1980, the defending Olympic downhill champion was from Austria and did not compete; Leonhard Stock was injured a month earlier in early January.

Bill Johnson of the United States became the first from outside the Alps to win an Olympic downhill. In his first full World Cup season, he was a top "glider" and made up time on the flatter lower third of the course. The previous best finishes for an American man in an Olympic downhill was fifth (1952, 1980), and sixth (1976); American women had won three medals (1960, 1972, 1976), but never a gold.

Results
The race was started at 12:00 local time, (UTC+1).

References

External links
 
FIS results

Men's downhill